Eleni Daniilidou was the defending champion but was knocked out in the first round by Kristýna Plíšková.
Urszula Radwańska went on to win the title by defeating Coco Vandeweghe 6–1, 4–6, 6–1 in the final.

Seeds

Draw

Finals

Top half

Bottom half

References
 Main Draw
 Qualifying Draw

Aegon Trophy - Singles
2012 Women's Singles